Security in the Persian Gulf Region is a 2016 book by Fatemeh Shayan in which the author examines developments in the Persian Gulf security complex after the 2003 US invasion of Iraq, emphasizing threats to the collective identities of two religious sects - Shia and Sunni. The book won the Farabi International Award in 2019.

See also
Shia–Sunni relations

References

External links 
 Security in the Persian Gulf Region

2016 non-fiction books
English-language books
Political science books
Palgrave Macmillan books
Books about politics of Iran
Monographs
Books about politics of Saudi Arabia